Poyntz may refer to:

People
Billy Poyntz (1894–1966), Welsh footballer
Hugh Poyntz (1877–1955), English soldier and cricketer
Juliet Stuart Poyntz (1886–1937), American suffragist, feminist, trade unionist and communist
Massey Poyntz (1883–1934), English cricketer
Nicholas Poyntz (1510–1556), English courtier
Sarah Poyntz (born 1926), Irish journalist and author
Sydnam Poyntz, 17th-century English soldier
William Stephen Poyntz (1770–1840), English politician
William Poyntz (high sheriff), 18th-century English High Sheriff of Berkshire
Poyntz Tyler (1906–1971), American writer

The name of Poyntz occurred in medieval England, see Feudal barony of Curry Mallet and Manor of Iron Acton, and also in Ireland.

Places
Poyntzpass, a village in County Armagh, Northern Ireland
Sutton Poyntz (liberty), a liberty in the county of Dorset, England

See also
Pointz, a surname variant